This is a list of seasons completed by Oldham Athletic A.F.C.  in English football, from 1904—when the club began playing professionally—to the most recent completed season. The list details accomplishments in all competitions the club has entered. The club has never participated in any major competitions outside of the United Kingdom.

History
The club was created in 1899 after Pine Villa Football Club folded earlier the same year. In the early years, Oldham played mostly at the junior level of competition. In 1899, Oldham Athletic played their first game in the Manchester Alliance League versus Berry's Blacking Works Second XI. The following season, the club would move to the Manchester Football League after finishing as runners-up. The club began to play professionally in 1904 as they moved into the Lancashire Combination B Division and were immediately promoted to the A Division by finishing as runners-up.

After two seasons in the Lancashire Combination, the club gained acceptance into the Football League in June 1907 when Burslem Port Vale resigned from the league. Unlike many clubs, Oldham Athletic gained early success in the league as they finished in third place in the Football League Second Division. By 1910, the club was playing in the top flight of English football after the club had finishing in the runners-up spot in the 1909–10 season. It would not be until the 1952–53 season when the club would once again win a trophy, as they finished at the top of the Football League Third Division North table. By the late 1950s, the club was in the Football League Fourth Division and twice had to apply for re-election into the Football League, including a finish of 23rd in 1959–60, their lowest rank in the League.

By the mid-1960s, the club's fortunes had turned as they gained promotion back into the Football League Third Division. In 1973–74, Jimmy Frizzell led Oldham back to the Second Division as the club won their first league title since 1953.  Unlike the previous visit into the division, the club was not relegated quickly. In the late 1970s, the club were runners-up in the Anglo-Scottish Cup following a loss to Burnley 4–2 on aggregate. Under Joe Royle in 1989–90 season, Oldham had their best finish in a major English cup by finishing as runners-up in the 1990 Football League Cup Final. The following season, Oldham won the Second Division and were promoted to the Football League First Division for the first time in 64 years and, in 1992–93, the club was a founding member of the FA Premier League.

The club was relegated back into the First Division following the 1993–94 season with Joe Royle leaving to join Everton during the next season. In the 1996–97 season, the club was relegated for the second time in four seasons and were back in the Second Division. After 21 consecutive seasons in the third tier of English football, the club were relegated to the renamed League Two for the first time since 1971. In 2021–22 they finished 23rd, 62 years after they had finished in the same position, and this time they were relegated automatically to the National League – the first former Premier League club to play non-League football.

Seasons

Key

 P – Played
 W – Games won
 D – Games drawn
 L – Games lost
 F – Goals for
 A – Goals against
 Pts – Points
 Pos – Final position

 Lan C-1 – Lancashire Combination A Division
 Lan C-2 – Lancashire Combination B Division
 Div 1 – Football League First Division
 Div 2 – Football League Second Division
 Div 3 – Football League Third Division
 Div 3N – Football League Third Division North
 Div 4 – Football League Fourth Division
 Prem – Premier League
 Champ – Football League Championship
 Lge 1 – Football League One
 Lge 2 – Football League Two
 NL – National League

 GS – Group stage
 R1 – First round
 R2 – Second round
 R3 – Third round
 R4 – Fourth round
 R5 – Fifth round
 QF – Quarter-finals
 SF – Semi-finals
 F – Regional final
 RU – Runners-up
 W – Winners
 (N) – Northern section of regionalised stage

Division shown in bold when it changes due to promotion or relegation.

Footnotes

References

External links
 Oldham Athletic at Soccerbase
 Football Club History Database
 Football Site
 Oldham Athletic at Historical Football Kits

Seasons
 
Oldham Athletic